Kim Tae-han (born 24 February 1996) is a South Korean football defender, who plays for Gimpo FC in the K3 League, the third tier of football in South Korea. He previously played in the K League 1 for Daegu FC.

Club career
Born on 24 February 1996, Kim played his youth football for Hanyang University. He joined Daegu FC in January 2018 and made his debut for the club on 13 May 2018, playing against Suwon Bluewings in the K League 1. Unused in the 2020 season, the following year he transferred to Gimpo FC, which played in the K3 League.

Club career statistics

Honors and awards

Player
Daegu FC
 Korean FA Cup Winners (1) : 2018

Gimpo FC
 League Winners (1) : 2021 K3 League

References

1996 births
Living people
People from Daegu
Sportspeople from Daegu
Association football defenders
South Korean footballers
Daegu FC players
K League 1 players